Bonk is a surname. It is a variant of the Polish surname Bąk, which has several meanings, including Botaurus (a genus of birds in the heron family), horse-fly, child, and bumblebee. Notable people with the surname include:
Bartłomiej Bonk (born 1984), Polish weightlifter
Charles S. Bonk (1920–1976), American businessman and politician
Gerd Bonk (1951–2014), German weightlifter
James Bonk (1931–2013), American chemist and academic
John Bonk (born 1950), 2008 inductee into the Canadian Football Hall of Fame
Julia Bonk (born 1986), German politician
Keiko Bonk (born 1954), Hawaiian activist, artist, musician and politician
Radek Bonk (born 1976), Czech professional ice hockey player
Steven Bonk, Canadian politician
Tino Bonk (born 1967), German bobsledder

Polish-language surnames
Surnames of Polish origin